The 12th constituency of Yvelines is a French legislative constituency in the Yvelines département.

Description

The 12th constituency of Yvelines lies in the centre of the ward and is formed of the very western fringes of the Parisian suburbs around the town of Poissy.

The seat has returned conservative deputies to the National Assembly in every election since 1988. In 2009, Jacques Masdeu-Arus was replaced by his substitute David Douillet upon his appointment to the Constitutional Council. David Douillet was himself replaced by Joël Regnault in 2011 after having been appointed to serve in the government of François Fillon.

Historic Representation

Election results

 
 
 
 
 
 
 
 
|-
| colspan="8" bgcolor="#E9E9E9"|
|-

2017

 
 
 
 
 
 
 
|-
| colspan="8" bgcolor="#E9E9E9"|
|-

2012

 
 
 
 
 
|-
| colspan="8" bgcolor="#E9E9E9"|
|-

2007

 
 
 
 
 
 
 
 
|-
| colspan="8" bgcolor="#E9E9E9"|
|-

2002

 
 
 
 
 
|-
| colspan="8" bgcolor="#E9E9E9"|
|-

1997

 
 
 
 
 
 
 
 
 
|-
| colspan="8" bgcolor="#E9E9E9"|
|-

Sources
Official results of French elections from 2002: "Résultats électoraux officiels en France" (in French).

12